Events in the year 1678 in Norway.

Incumbents
Monarch: Christian V

Events
  Gyldenløve War: July – Røros was burned to the ground by the Swedish Army.

Arts and literature

Births

Deaths
12 August – Jacob Maschius, clergyman, poet and copperplate engraver (born c.1630).

Exact date missing 
Christen Bang, priest and theological writer (born 1584).

See also

References